Eslamabad (also Romanized as Eslāmābād) is a village in Azadeh Rural District, Moshrageh District, Ramshir County, Khuzestan Province, Iran. At the 2006 census, its population was 229, in 39 families.

References 

Populated places in Ramshir County